Yuanshan is a town of Pingchang County, Sichuan, China. , it has two residential communities and 14 villages under its administration.

References

Towns in Sichuan
Pingchang County